Valentine-Wilder House is a historic home located at Spring Hope, Nash County, North Carolina.  It was built about 1925, and is a -story, side gabled, Arts and Crafts-influenced, Rustic Revival style log dwelling. It sits on stone piers and has three large exterior gable end stone chimneys. Also on the property is a contributing log smokehouse / office (c. 1925).

It was listed on the National Register of Historic Places in 2013.

References

Log houses in the United States
Houses on the National Register of Historic Places in North Carolina
Houses completed in 1925
Houses in Nash County, North Carolina
National Register of Historic Places in Nash County, North Carolina
Log buildings and structures on the National Register of Historic Places in North Carolina